The Dispilio tablet is a wooden tablet bearing inscribed markings, unearthed during George Hourmouziadis's excavations of Dispilio in Greece, and carbon 14-dated to 5202  (± 123) BC.  It was discovered in 1993 in a Neolithic  lakeshore settlement that occupied an artificial island near the modern village of Dispilio on Lake Kastoria in Kastoria, Western Macedonia, Greece.

Discovery

The lake settlement itself was discovered during the dry winter of 1932, which lowered the lake level and revealed traces of the settlement. A preliminary survey was made in 1935 by Antonios Keramopoulos. Excavations began in 1992, led by George Hourmouziadis, professor of prehistoric archaeology at the Aristotle University of Thessaloniki. The site appears to have been occupied over a long period, from the final stages of the Middle Neolithic (5600–5000 BC) to the Final Neolithic (3000 BC). A number of items were found, including ceramics, wooden structural elements, the remains of wooden walkways, seeds, bones, figurines, personal ornaments, flutes and a tablet with marks on it.

The tablet's discovery was announced at a symposium in February 1994 at the University of Thessaloniki. The site's paleoenvironment, botany, fishing techniques, tools and ceramics were described informally in a magazine article in 2000, and by Hourmouziadis in 2002.

The tablet itself was partially damaged when it was exposed to the oxygen-rich environment outside of the mud and water in which it was immersed for a long period of time, and so it was placed under conservation. , the full academic publication of the tablet apparently awaits the completion of conservation work.

See also

References

Sources
G. H. Hourmouziadis, ed., Dispilio, 7500 Years After. Thessaloniki, 2002.
G. H. Hourmouziadis,  Ανασκαφής Εγκόλπιον. Athens, 2006.

External links
Anaskamma, an academic journal of the excavational team

6th-millennium BC works
1993 archaeological discoveries
1993 in Greece
Archaeology of Greece
Inscriptions in undeciphered writing systems
Inscriptions in unknown languages
Neolithic
Neolithic Macedonia (region)
Pre-Indo-Europeans
Proto-writing